Cascade School District may refer to:

 Cascade School District, Idaho
 Cascade School District (Oregon)
 Cascade School District, Washington